This is the list of Ahmadu Bello University chancellors since inception on 4 October 1962.
Ahmadu Bello University chancellor is the ceremonial, titular and non-resident head of the university

Further reading
Undergraduate Student Handbook 11th ed.

References

Ahmadu Bello University chancellors